The Premios 40 Principales for Best America International Dance Act is an honor presented annually at the Los 40 Principaless, a ceremony that recognizes excellence, creates a greater awareness of cultural diversity and contributions of Latino artists in the international scene.

This is a list of the Los Premios 40 Principales winners and nominees for Best America International Dance Act.

External links
Official site

Spanish awards
Spanish music
Latin American music
European music awards